In set theory, a Laver function (or Laver diamond, named after its inventor, Richard Laver) is a function connected with supercompact cardinals.

Definition
If κ is a supercompact cardinal, a Laver function is a function ƒ:κ → Vκ such that for every set x and every cardinal λ ≥ |TC(x)| + κ there is a supercompact measure U on [λ]<κ such that if j U is the associated elementary embedding then j U(ƒ)(κ) = x. (Here Vκ denotes the κ-th level of the cumulative hierarchy, TC(x) is the transitive closure of x)

Applications
The original application of Laver functions was the following theorem of Laver.   
If κ is supercompact, there is a κ-c.c. forcing notion (P, ≤) such after forcing with (P, ≤) the following holds: κ is supercompact and remains supercompact after forcing with any κ-directed closed forcing.

There are many other applications, for example the proof of the consistency of the proper forcing axiom.

References

Set theory
Large cardinals
Functions and mappings